John Robert Eibner (March 13, 1914 – November 23, 1973) was an American football tackle. 

Eibner was born in 1914 in Elyria, Ohio. He attended Jeannette High School in Jeannette, Pennsylvania.

He attended the University of Kentucky where he played for the 1938, 1939, and 1940 Kentucky Wildcats football teams. He was elected captain of the 1940 team.

He then played professional football in the National Football League (NFL) for the Philadelphia Eagles (NFL) in 1941, 1942, and 1946. He appeared in 30 NFL games, 16 as a starter. 

His NFL career was interrupted by military service during World War II. He later worked for many years for the University of Florida, including roles as an assistant football coach and fundraiser. He died in 1973 at age 59.

References

1914 births
1973 deaths
Philadelphia Eagles players
Kentucky Wildcats football players
American football tackles
Players of American football from Ohio
People from Elyria, Ohio